Ekaterina Reyngold (born 7 April 2001) is a Russian tennis player.

Reyngold has a career-high WTA singles ranking of  233 and a best doubles ranking of 217. She has won one singles title and ten doubles titles at tournaments of the ITF Circuit.

She made her WTA Tour main-draw debut at the 2022 Morocco Open.

Grand Slam performance timeline

Singles

ITF finals

Singles: 4 (1 title, 3 runner–ups)

Doubles: 15 (10 titles, 5 runner–ups)

References

External links
 
 

2001 births
Living people
Russian female tennis players
Tennis players from Moscow
21st-century Russian women